The 2008 Thomas & Uber Cup was the 25th tournament of the Thomas Cup and 22nd tournament of the Uber Cup, the men's and women's team competition in badminton, respectively. It was held in Jakarta, Indonesia, from May 11 to May 18, 2008.

Host city selection
China, Indonesia, and the United States submitted a bid for the event. International Badminton Federation selected Indonesia as the host for the event during a council meeting in December 2005.

Qualification

Seedings
All the seeding list based on February 28, 2008 world rankings as the draw was conducted on March 11, 2008. The top four seeding teams is in first pot, follow by next four teams in the second pot and the bottom four teams was put in the third pot.

Thomas Cup

Uber Cup

Squads

Thomas Cup

Groups

Group A

Group B

Group C

Group D

Knockout stage

Uber Cup

Groups

Group W

Group X

Group Y

Group Z

Knockout stage

Controversies
The controversy arose when an unfair scheduling forced some of the teams to play twice a day. Most of the teams were unhappy with the Badminton World Federation decision, including the Indonesia Uber Cup team who threatened to pull out from the tournament due to the scheduling affair, forcing organisers to amend the schedule.

Another controversy cropped up in the tournament was the decision of Korea Thomas Cup team to throw both of their group matches to get a better opposition in the knockout stage. They lost 4–1 in both group matches against England and Malaysia and soon admitted they played to lose the game. However, Korean manager denied any fault on them and blamed on the format. This controversy forced the BWF to reexamine the rules and format for future tournaments.

References

External links
Thomas and Uber Cup 2008 at tournamentsoftware.com

 
Thomas & Uber Cup
2008 in badminton
2008 in Indonesian sport
International sports competitions hosted by Indonesia
Sports competitions in Jakarta
Badminton tournaments in Indonesia